Martin Wágner (born 14 June 1980 in Prague, Czechoslovakia) is a Czech photographer known for his series of photographs taken in former Soviet Union. In his works made between 1994 and 2012, Wágner focuses mainly on depicting urban and village life in Siberia.

In ten years he took the Czech Press Photo award for best Czech and Slovak photojournalists four times. In 2009 he received 2nd prize in the international FRAME competition.

In 2006 he participated in the documentarist project Prayer for Chernobyl with Czech-American photographer Antonín Kratochvíl and Greenpeace spokesman Václav Vašků.

Notes

External links
 Martin Wágner homepage
 Czech television report on Wágner's exhibition in Prague
 Public Czech Radio report on Wágner's photographs from Ukraine and Russia
 Text about Martin Wágner by Czech historian Aleš Kuneš

Living people
Photographers from Prague
1980 births